Eilema brunneotincta is a moth of the  subfamily Arctiinae. It was described by Rothschild in 1912. It is found in South Africa.

References

Endemic moths of South Africa
brunneotincta
Moths described in 1912